Schistochila lehmanniana is a species of liverwort in the family Schistochilaceae.

References

Jungermanniales
Flora of Australia
Flora of New Zealand
Flora of Chile
Plants described in 1888